Amietia desaegeri is a species of frog in the family Pyxicephalidae. It is found west and south of the Rwenzori Mountains in eastern Democratic Republic of the Congo and north-western Rwanda. The common names Byangolo frog and De Saeger's river frog have been coined for it.

Description
Skin is smooth but there are two dorso-lateral folds that running from the eyes to the inguinal region. The dorsum is pale beige, with brown infusions but no distinct markings; vertebral stripe is absent. There is a pale band between the eyes and between the tympanum and eye. The nostrils are dark and a thin dark line runs from the nostril to the eye. The tympanum is pale at its centre. The supratympanic fold is cream. The fingers and toes are pale. There are poorly contrasted transverse bars on the femur and tibia are thin.

Habitat and conservation
It lives in and around streams, its presumed breeding habitat. It can be locally abundant and tolerates a high degree of habitat disturbance; no major threats are known. It occurs in the Virunga National Park in the Democratic Republic of the Congo and the Gishwati Forest Reserve in Rwanda.

References

desaegeri
Frogs of Africa
Amphibians of the Democratic Republic of the Congo
Amphibians of Rwanda
Amphibians described in 1972
Taxa named by Raymond Laurent